The Ackerson Mead Clark House is a historic mansion in Pequannock, New Jersey listed on the New Jersey State Historic Register.

History

Located at 183 Mountain Ave in Pequannock, NJ, the Ackerson Mead Clark House is a 21 room Greek Revival mansion built in the mid-1800s.

With a history spanning three centuries, the mansion was only added to the New Jersey Department of Environmental Protection's Register of Historic Places by a decision rendered on July 29, 1981. Despite extensive renovation in the early 2000s the front exterior Greek Revival colonnade, original staircase, 1870s fireplaces, and a wide variety of architectural details and moldings remain intact. Originally a plantation style structure located in an agrarian community, the property surrounding the private residence has been reduced to 1.37acres over decades of nearby development.

Currently known as "Willow Manor," the mansion was listed for sale in 2011 at a list price of $1.4 million.

The property is also considered a New Jersey Highlands Region Cultural Resource.

References

Greek Revival houses in New Jersey
Historic buildings and structures in the United States
Houses in Morris County, New Jersey
1880s architecture in the United States